Superman (1977) is the nineteenth studio album by American singer Barbra Streisand. The lead single "My Heart Belongs to Me" became a hit in 1977, peaking at #4 on the US pop chart. The title track was released as a follow-up. The album peaked at number 3 on the Top 200 LP Billboard album chart and on the UK Albums Chart at number 32. It has sold 2 million copies in United States and was certified 2× Platinum.

Background and production
The album was released after the success of Streisand's movie A Star Is Born, from 1976. At that time the movie soundtrack was the singer's best-selling album with 4.1 million copies sold worldwide and a platinum certificate in the United States, for more than 1 million copies sold. According to The New York Times, the album brings sounds from what they called "the second transition in Streisand's career", which began with the Stoney End album, in 1970, in which the singer experimented contemporary pop rock sounds and left aside "old‐fashioned" and "theatrical diva" from her early LPs, and that in Superman she confirms as a "a credible interpreter of contemporary songs".

Two songs were written for the movie A Star Is Born but not used in the picture — "Answer Me" by Streisand, Paul Williams and Kenny Ascher; and "Lullaby for Myself" by Rupert Holmes. It also includes cover versions of contemporary singer-songwriters Kim Carnes' "Love Comes from Unexpected Places" from her album Sailin' and Billy Joel's "New York State of Mind" from Turnstiles. According to Joel, Streisand's recording resulted in his mother looking at his career with newfound respect: "Certainly my mom looked at me with fresh eyes--finally, a real singer had picked up on her errant son's efforts."

Critical reception

The album received good reviews from music critics. William Ruhlmann from AllMusic website gave the album three out of five stars and wrote that even though the album "seemed to be an unusually personal album for the singer, reflecting her feelings and viewpoints"  it is not one of her best. Dave Marsh from Rolling Stone magazine, wrote that the album was Steisand best effort since her Stoney End (1970) album, and that it's an "ample evidence that Streisand actually can get away with singing whatever she chooses". He also wrote that even though there are some mannerisms, like her phrasing, "the material is chosen skillfully enough to transcend that". In his review for The New York Times, Stephen Holden wrote that Superman "ranks among the finest of Barbra Streisand's 30plus LP's", and that her "voice is in amazing shape today—stronger, more controlled and more confident than ever".

Commercial performance
The album repeated the success of the singer's previous album, the movie soundtrack A Star Is Born, and as of November 1977, it had sold 1.6 million copies in the United States, three times more than the two previous studio albums: Butterfly (1974) and Lazy Afternoon (1975). The album peaked at number 3 on the Billboard 200 album chart and on the UK Albums Chart at number 32. On November 14, 1994, it was certified double platinum by the Recording Industry Association of America (RIAA), for 2 million copies sold in the United States.

Track listing
 "Superman" (Richie Snyder) – 2:47
 "Don't Believe What You Read" (Barbra Streisand, Ron Nagle, Scott Mathews) – 3:37
 "Baby Me Baby" (Roger Miller) – 4:26
 "I Found You Love" (Alan Gordon) – 3:50
 "Answer Me" (Streisand, Paul Williams, Kenny Ascher) – 3:16
 "My Heart Belongs to Me" (Alan Gordon) – 3:21
 "Cabin Fever" (Ron Nagle) – 3:14
 "Love Comes from Unexpected Places" (Kim Carnes, Dave Ellingson) – 4:10
 "New York State of Mind" (Billy Joel) – 4:44
 "Lullaby for Myself" (Rupert Holmes) – 3:17

Personnel
 Barbra Streisand – vocals
 Gary Klein, Charles Calello (track 6) – Producers
 Steve Schapiro – Photography
Alan Broadbent, David Foster, David Paich, David Wolfert, Dennis Budimir, Ed Greene, Eddie Karam, Emil Richards, Fred Tackett, Gary Coleman, Gayle LeVant, Harry Bluestone, Harvey Mason, Israel Baker, Jay Graydon, Jeff Porcaro, John Bahler, John McClure, Larry Carlton, Lee Ritenour, Lincoln Mayorga, Michael Boddicker, Mike Melvoin, Plas Johnson, Ralph Grierson, Reine Press, Robben Ford, Scott Mathews, Steve Paietta, Tommy Tedesco, Virginia Berger – musicians 
 Augie Johnson, Clydie King, Jim Gilstrap, John Lehman, Julia Tillman Waters, Venetta Fields – background vocals

Charts

Weekly charts

Year-end charts

Certifications

}
}

}

References

Barbra Streisand albums
1977 albums
Albums produced by Gary Klein (producer)
Columbia Records albums